Raymond Wilcox (12 April 1921 – 26 January 2003) was a Welsh professional footballer who played as a centre half.

Career
Born in Treharris, Glamorgan, Wilcox joined Second Division side Newport County from Treharris Athletic in 1939. He remained at the club for over 30 years, making over 500 appearances without scoring. He captained Newport as they reached the fifth round of the FA Cup in the 1948–49 season, the furthest they have ever progressed in the competition. Wilcox was rewarded with a testimonial in 1959, which featured Stanley Matthews. Following his retirement, Wilcox remained at Newport as trainer.

Personal life
During World War II, Wilcox worked as a PE instructor for the Royal Air Force at St Andrew's golf course in Scotland.

Wilcox suffered from Alzheimer's disease for the last six years of his life. He died in hospital in Newport of a perforated ulcer on 26 January 2003, aged 81. He was survived by his second wife, Margaret, and his son from his first marriage.

References

1921 births
2003 deaths
Welsh footballers
Newport County A.F.C. players
English Football League players
Association football defenders